The following is a list people associated with the University of Jaffna, including its predecessor, the Jaffna Campus of the University of Sri Lanka.

Chancellors, vice-chancellors and presidents

Academics
 Srikanthalakshmi Arulanandam - Principle Librarian
 P. Balasundarampillai - professor of geography, dean of the Faculty of Arts and vice-chancellor
 Sucharitha Gamlath - professor of Sinhala and dean of the Faculty of Arts
 K. Indrapala - professor of history and dean of the Faculty of Arts
 W. L. Jeyasingham - associate professor of geography, head of the Department of Geography and dean of the Faculty of Arts
 P. Kanagasabapathy - professor of mathematics, head of the Department of Mathematics and Statistics and dean of the Faculty of Science
 R. Kumaravadivel - senior professor of physics, head of the Department of Physics, head of the Computer Unit, dean of the Faculty of Science and acting vice-chancellor
 K. Kunaratnam - emeritus professor of physics, head of the Department of Physics, head of the Department of Computer Science, dean of the Faculty of Science and vice-chancellor
 S. Mohanadas - dean of the Faculty of Agriculture
 M. Nadarajasundaram - senior lecturer, head of the Department of Commerce and Management Studies, dean of the Faculty of Management Studies and Commerce
 S. Selvanayagam - head of the Department of Geography
 M. Sivasuriya - professor of obstetrics and gynaecology, head of the Department of Obstetrics and Gynaecology and chancellor.
 K. Sivathamby - emeritus professor and head of the Department of Fine Arts
 Rajini Thiranagama - head of the Department of Anatomy

Alumni
 S. Jebanesan - Church of South India Bishop of Jaffna
 M. Nadarajasundaram - Dean of the Faculty of Management Studies and Commerce
 Jude Perera - member of the Victorian Legislative Assembly  
 Joseph Ponniah - Roman Catholic Bishop of Batticaloa
 R. Sivagurunathan - editor of Thinakaran
 S. Sritharan - Member of Parliament for Jaffna District
 Chelvy Thiyagarajah - poet and International PEN award winner

Notes

References

 

Jaffna